Giacomo Perini (born 16 May 1996) is an Italian paralympic rower who won a gold medal at the 2022 European Rowing Championships.

References

External links

1996 births
Living people
Italian male rowers
Paralympic rowers of Italy